Lee Andrew Gilmour (born 12 March 1978) is an English assistant coach at Wakefield Trinity in the Super League and a former professional rugby league footballer. He played in the Super League for the Wigan Warriors (Heritage № 911) (with whom he won 1998's Super League III), the Bradford Bulls, St Helens (Heritage № 1135) (with whom he won 2006's Super League XI), the Huddersfield Giants, Wakefield Trinity Wildcats and the Castleford Tigers (Heritage № 935). Gilmour represented Great Britain and Scotland at international level.

Background
Gilmour was born in Dewsbury, West Yorkshire, England.

Playing career
Gilmour started his career with Shaw Cross Sharks, had a spell at Thornhill Trojans, and played for Dewsbury Moor before signing for Wigan Warriors. He toured New Zealand with Great Britain Academy in 1997. Gilmour played for the Wigan Warriors from the interchange bench in their 2000 Super League Grand Final loss against St. Helens.

Gilmour went on to play for Bradford Bulls, the Great Britain, Emerging England, and Scotland. As Super League VI champions, the Bradford Bulls played against 2001 NRL Premiers, the Newcastle Knights in the 2002 World Club Challenge. Gilmour played at centre in Bradford's victory. Gilmour played for Bradford Bulls from the bench in their 2002 Super League Grand Final loss against St. Helens.
Gilmour played for St Helens from the interchange bench in their 2006 Challenge Cup Final victory against the Huddersfield Giants.
Gilmour gained true international repute when during the 2006 Rugby League Tri-Nations he scored the decisive try in the Lions' 23-12 win in Aussie Stadium in 2006. 
As 2006 Super League champions, St Helens faced 2006 NRL Premiers the Brisbane Broncos in the 2007 World Club Challenge.
He played in 2008's Super League XIII Grand Final defeat by the Leeds Rhinos.

In July 2009 it was announced that Gilmour had signed a two-year contract with Super League rivals, Huddersfield Giants.

He played in the 2009 Super League Grand Final defeat by the Leeds Rhinos at Old Trafford.

On 23 June 2011 Gilmour signed a new two-year deal with Huddersfield Giants despite talks of his retirement.

In June 2012 Gilmour negotiated an early release from his Huddersfield Giants contract and went on to sign a two-year deal with the Castleford Tigers.

In May 2014, Gilmour joined Wakefield Trinity Wildcats on loan. In September 2014, he was appointed as a coach at Wakefield.

On 22 July 2016, Gilmour signed for his home town amateur club Shaw Cross Sharks where he started his career to play in the prestigious amateur RL competition in National Conference Division 1 till the end of the 2016 season.

References

External links
!Great Britain Statistics at englandrl.co.uk (statistics currently missing due to not having appeared for both Great Britain, and England)
Lee Gilmour Player Profile
Statistics at wigan.rlfans.com
Profile at saints.org.uk
Gilmour targets silverware
Gilmour gets Scottish call
Clockwatch: Australia 12-23 Great Britain
Gilmour keen to end barren run

1978 births
Living people
Bradford Bulls players
Castleford Tigers players
English people of Scottish descent
English rugby league coaches
English rugby league players
Great Britain national rugby league team players
Huddersfield Giants players
Rugby league centres
Rugby league locks
Rugby league players from Dewsbury
Rugby league second-rows
Rugby league wingers
Scotland national rugby league team players
St Helens R.F.C. players
Wakefield Trinity players
Wigan Warriors players
Yorkshire rugby league team players